Makotimpoko is a district in the Plateaux  Department of Republic of the Congo.

References 

Plateaux Department (Republic of the Congo)
Districts of the Republic of the Congo